Jeffrey Franklin Paine (born August 19, 1961) is a former American football linebacker in the National Football League (NFL) for the Kansas City Chiefs, the St. Louis Cardinals, and the Washington Redskins.  He played college football at Texas A&M University and was drafted in the fifth round of the 1984 NFL Draft.

1961 births
Living people
American football linebackers
Kansas City Chiefs players
Washington Redskins players
St. Louis Cardinals (football) players
Texas A&M Aggies football players
People from Garland, Texas